Sebastian "Sebi" Ioan Sfârlea (born 26 July 1981) is a Romanian former footballer who played as a midfielder. In his career, Sfârlea played mostly for Bihor Oradea, but also for teams such as FC Vaslui, Politehnica Iași, FCM Târgu Mureș or CS Mioveni. Despite his height of only 1.65m, Sfârlea is recognized for his very strong shot and is considered as a very good free kick taker.

References

External links
 
 
 Sebastian Sfârlea at frf-ajf.ro

1981 births
Living people
Sportspeople from Oradea
Romanian footballers
Association football midfielders
Liga I players
Liga II players
FC Bihor Oradea players
FC Vaslui players
FC Politehnica Iași (1945) players
ASA 2013 Târgu Mureș players
CS Mioveni players
CS Luceafărul Oradea players
Romanian expatriate footballers
Romanian expatriate sportspeople in Hungary
Expatriate footballers in Hungary